The Scottish watershed is the drainage divide in Scotland that separates river systems that flow to the east into the North Sea from those that flow to the west and north into the Atlantic Ocean. At a point on the summit of Ben Lomond for example, looking west all water flows to the Firth of Clyde, and looking east all water flows into the Firth of Forth. 
Similarly Cumbernauld is a point on this line and arguably its Gaelic name has, for hundreds of years, reflected this fact. There is some dispute however about interpretation of the Gaelic phrase. The line joining all such points in Scotland is the Scottish watershed.

Although the concept of geographical watersheds is common, the first unequivocal reference to the Scottish watershed is to be found in Groome's Ordnance Gazetteer of 1884, in which the entry defines the northern terminus as being at Duncansby Head. This was followed in 1912 with the Bartholomew Atlas Survey (NLS) which shows the entire geographic feature, from the border with England to Duncansby Head. The first popular delineation of the Scottish watershed took place as recently as 1986.  It was mapped out in that year by Dave Hewitt, who in 1987 then walked the line of the watershed from south to north. The Royal Scottish Geographical Society (RSGS) reviewed Wright`s 'Ribbon of Wildness' in 2011, and in acknowledging the significance of the route, stated that "Ribbon of Wildness gives a vivid introduction to this hitherto largely unknown geographic feature". Eight people have now done versions of this route:

Hewitt walked from the Anglo-Scottish border to Cape Wrath in a single push, April–June 1987
the late Mike Allen walked from Land's End to Cape Wrath in numerous mainly short sections, April 1988 – October 1994
Martin Prouse walked from Rowardennan to Ben Hope in one go, July–August 1994
Peter Wright walked from the Anglo-Scottish border to Duncansby Head in eight sections, Jan–Oct 2005
Malcolm Wylie completed a 131-day traverse of the UK, in 14 sections - Scottish sections 1996 and 2,000 - Peel Fell to Duncansby Head.
Colin Meek completed a watershed run in 27 days in summer 2012 - Peel Fell to Duncansby Head.
Chris Townsend completed a traverse from Peel Fell to Duncansby Head in 2013, 28 May – 25 July
Elspeth Luke ran the entire watershed in a continuous 34-day epic from 13 July to 15 August 2015. She is the first woman to complete this journey.
Neil Fraser completed the 97 Mile Shetland Mainland Watershed over 8 continuous days on the 3rd of July 2018.
Liam Fraser and Neil Fraser completed the 34 Mile Yell Watershed over 3 separate Days on the 24th July 2020.
Liam Fraser and Neil Fraser Completed the 17 Mile Unst Watershed over 2 separate days on the 9th of August 2020

See also
Geography of the North Sea

References

Francis Hindes Groome, Ordnance Gazetteer of Scotland, 1884
Bartholomew, Atlas Survey, 1919
Ribbon of Wildness. Peter Wright. pub Luath Press, 2010
Walking with Wildness. Peter Wright. pub Luath Press, 2012

External links
Walking the Watershed: The Border to Cape Wrath along Scotland's Great Divide, by Dave Hewitt, Glasgow Digital Library
Map of the original watershed route
Ribbon of Wildness - Peter Wright's website

Landforms of Scotland
Walking in the United Kingdom
Drainage divides
Administrative divisions of Scotland